Hold Back the Night is a 1956 film about the Korean War.

Hold Back the Night may also refer to:

 Hold Back the Night, a 1951 novel by Pat Frank, on which the aforementioned film is based
 "Hold Back the Night", a 1975 song by The Trammps, remade by Graham Parker in 1977
 Hold Back the Night, a 1999 film directed by Phil Davis
 "Hold Back the Night", a 2012 single by I Am Kloot from their album Let It All In
"Hold Back the Night", a 2015 single by The Protomen.
 Hold Back the Night, a 2015 live album by I Am Kloot, released in 2015